Christy Moore is the fourth solo album by Irish folk musician Christy Moore, released in 1976.

All tracks were produced by Dónal Lunny and recorded at Dublin Sound Studios, except "Nancy Spain" which was produced by Nicky Ryan in Eamon Andrews Studios.

Track listing 
 "The Dalesman's Litany" – 4:03
 "Galtee Mountain Boy" – :3:37
 "Little Musgrave" – 6:34
 "Wave Up to the Shore" – 2:45
 "Nancy Spain" – 3:32
 "Lanigans Ball" – 3:16
 "Johnny Jump Up" – 2:53
 "Scriff Martyrs" – 5:56
 "Limerick Rake" – 3:01
 "Boys of Mullabawn" – 4:19
 "Sacco & Vanzetti" – 4:37

Personnel 
 Christy Moore – vocals, bodhrán
 Dónal Lunny – producer, bouzouki, guitar, vocals
 Declan McNeilis, Jimmy Faulkner – guitar
 Andy Irvine – mandolin
 Kevin Burke – fiddle
 Barney McKenna – banjo
 Jeff Whittaker, Lord Eric – African drums
 Nicky Ryan – producer on "Nancy Spain"

References

External links 
 Christy Moore at last.fm website Retrieved on 17 March 2015.
 Christy Moore at Discogs website Retrieved on 11 August 2014.

Christy Moore albums
1976 albums
Polydor Records albums